Saadatabad (also Romanized as Sa‘ādatābād; also known as Sākht-e Seydā) is a village in Vardasht Rural District, in the Central District of Semirom County, Isfahan Province, Iran. At the 2006 census, its population was 128, in 23 families.

References 

Populated places in Semirom County